The TL-10 (Tian Long - 10) or Sky Dragon (天龙) - 10 is a light anti-ship missile unveiled in the Zhuhai Airshow in 2004 in China, and it is the Chinese equivalent of the French MM-15TT / AS-15TT light anti-ship missile developed by Aérospatiale.

History

The development of the TL program appeared to have started in the mid-1990s and were originally identified as the FL-8 (TL-10) and FL-9 (TL-6) under China National Aero Technology Import & Export Company (CATIC). The program and missiles were officially revealed in the Zhuhai Airshow in 2004 by the China Aerospace Science and Industry Corporation (CASIC).

At the Zhuhai Airshow, two versions, TL-10A and TL-10B were revealed, A with the television seeker and the B with the radar seeker. The manufacturer revealed that plans to develop additional seekers such as imaging infrared were already in progress, that would enable the installation of the TL-10 on air and land platforms.

Development
TL-10 along with TL-6 are both developed and manufactured by Hongdu Aviation Industry Corporation, and the philosophy is identical to that of its French equivalent MM-15TT / AS-15TT light anti-ship missile developed by Aérospatiale.

There are thousands small of fast attack craft and patrol boats armed with anti-ship missiles that pose great threats, but are not cost effective to engage with traditional anti-ship missiles such as Harpoon and Exocet that are designed to engage large warships. Thus, it has been proved necessary to develop a light anti-ship missile to engage these small yet highly lethal boats.  TL-10, like C-701 is the Chinese answer to this problem.

Design

TL-10 is specifically designed to engage boats displacing 500 tons or less, and when launched, the missile will first climb to enable the seeker to acquire targets, and then immediately descend down to sea-skimming cruise altitude during its flight.  Like the anti-ship version of the C-701, TL-10 is also armed with a television seeker that is interchangeable with TL-6.  However, unlike the C-701 guidance has an additional command option which enables the operator to alter the targets, TL-10 is a purely fire-and-forget weapon.  Western sources have claimed that the Iranian anti-ship missile Kowsar which is manufactured by the Iran Aviation Industries Organization is based on TL-10 while the Nasr is based on the TL-6.

At the Zhuhai airshow in 2006, the manufacturer revealed the plan already in development to install this missile on various platforms including aircraft, surface ships, and  land vehicles. However, like most light anti-ship missiles in the world, it is certain that this missile would not be launched from submarines, as the manufacturer has confirmed. The version that has been successfully completed is the ship-to-ship version, hence the designation JJ/TL-10 at the 6th Zhuhai airshow in 2006, where JJ stands for Jian Jian (舰舰), meaning Ship (to) Ship.  Another version developed was KJ/TL-10, the air-launched version, with KJ stands for Kong Jian (空舰), meaning Air (to) ship.

FL-8
FL-8 (FL = Fei Long / Feilong, or 飞龙 in Chinese, meaning Flying Dragon) is the cheaper coastal defense version of TL-10.  Following the tradition of Silkworm missile, a land-based version with the lowest requirement is also developed for this missile: as the missile is stored in a controlled environment in a warehouse on land, the salinity, temperature and relative humidity requirements for the missile itself are greatly reduced. Because it is designed and deployed on land, the associate C4I systems can be located separately: the distributed system prevents electromagnetic interference, and if the C4I system is attacked, the distributed nature of the FL-8 would greatly reduce casualties and damage.

Kowsar
Kowsar (or Kosar) is the Iranian version of TL-10.  Noor (missile), the Iranian version of C-802, was previously often widely but erroneously credited by many as the missile that had hit Israeli corvette INS Hanit in the 2006 Lebanon War by Hezbollah, while post incident analysis has suggested that the missiles used was actually much smaller Kowsar instead.

TL-1
A new version of TL-10 appeared made its public debut at the 7th Zhuhai Airshow held at the end of 2008, together with its larger cousin TL-2.  Developed by Hongdu Aviation Industry Corporation, the same manufacturer of TL-10, the new missile is designated as TL-1, and appears almost identical to TL-10.  Not much information of TL-1 was released in detail at the air show, and based on scattered technical information published in China, it has been suggested that TL-1 is an upgraded TL-10 with a data link added, so that in addition to the original fire-and-forget capability, the only capability present on TL-10, there is an extra capability present on TL-1: operators can select to attack a different target other than the original one, if a greater threat has been identified after launching TL-1.  These are other speculations on TL-1, such as TL-10 was purely for export, while TL-1 is the designation for domestic Chinese use, but these have yet to be verified when more detailed technical information is released in the future.  Although the manufacturer has claimed that TL-1 can be deployed from various platform, the sample shown at the 7th Zhuhai Airshow was ship-born only, designated as JJ/TL-1, with JJ stands for Jian Jian (舰舰), meaning Ship (to) Ship.

Specifications
Dimensions:
Length:   2500 mm
Diameter: 180 mm
Wingspan: 568 mm
 Weight: 105 kg
Warhead: 30 kg, semi-armor piecing
Powerplant: twin thrust chamber, solid rocket motor
Speed: Mach 0.85
Range: 4–15 km
Guidance: Electro-optics/INS
Kill probability: 0.85
Developer: Hongdu Aviation Industry Corporation

Operators

Current operators
: Islamic Republic of Iran
: People's Republic of China

References
Report on the 5th Airshow China Zhuhai , Richard Fisher, Jr., PRC, November 1–7, 2004
China aids Iran's tactical missile programme, Robert Hewson, Jane's Defence Weekly, November 11, 2004
TL-1/10

Air-to-surface missiles
Anti-ship cruise missiles of the People's Republic of China